, art name , was a Japanese writer active in the Taishō period in Japan. He is regarded as the "father of the Japanese short story", and Japan's premier literary award, the Akutagawa Prize, is named after him. He committed suicide at the age of 35 through an overdose of barbital.

Early life 
Ryūnosuke Akutagawa was born in Irifune, Kyōbashi, Tokyo City (present-day Akashi, Chūō, Tokyo), the eldest son of businessman Toshizō Niihara and his wife Fuku. His family owned a milk production business. His mother experienced a mental illness shortly after his birth, so he was adopted and raised by his maternal uncle, Dōshō Akutagawa, from whom he received the Akutagawa family name. He was interested in classical Chinese literature from an early age, as well as in the works of Mori Ōgai and Natsume Sōseki.

He began writing after entering Tokyo Imperial University in 1913, where he studied English literature.

While still a student he proposed marriage to a childhood friend, Yayoi Yoshida, but his adoptive family did not approve the union. In 1916 he became engaged to Fumi Tsukamoto, whom he married in 1918. They had three children:  (1920–1981) was an actor, Takashi Akutagawa (1922–1945) was killed as a student draftee in Burma, and Yasushi Akutagawa (1925–1989) was a composer.

After graduation, he taught briefly at the Naval Engineering School in Yokosuka, Kanagawa as an English language instructor, before deciding to devote his full efforts to writing.

Literary career 

In 1914, Akutagawa and his former high school friends revived the literary journal Shinshichō ("New Currents of Thought"), publishing translations of William Butler Yeats and Anatole France along with their own works. Akutagawa published his second short story Rashōmon the following year in the literary magazine Teikoku Bungaku ("Imperial Literature"), while still a student. The story, based on a twelfth-century tale, was not well received by Akutagawa's friends, who criticized it extensively. Nonetheless, Akutagawa gathered the courage to visit his idol, Natsume Sōseki, in December 1915 for Sōseki's weekly literary circles. In November, he published his short story Rashomon on Teikoku Mongaku, a literary magazine. In early 1916 he published Hana ("The Nose", 1916), which attracted a letter of praise from Sōseki and secured Akutagawa his first taste of fame.

It was also at this time that he started writing haiku under the haigo (or pen-name) Gaki. Akutagawa followed with a series of short stories set in Heian period, Edo period or early Meiji period Japan. These stories reinterpreted classical works and historical incidents. Examples of these stories include: Gesaku zanmai ("A Life Devoted to Gesaku", 1917) and Kareno-shō ("Gleanings from a Withered Field", 1918), Jigoku hen ("Hell Screen", 1918); Hōkyōnin no shi ("The Death of a Christian", 1918), and Butōkai ("The Ball", 1920). Akutagawa was a strong opponent of naturalism. He published Mikan ("Mandarin Oranges", 1919) and Aki ("Autumn", 1920) which have more modern settings.

In 1921, Akutagawa interrupted his writing career to spend four months in China, as a reporter for the Osaka Mainichi Shinbun. The trip was stressful and he suffered from various illnesses, from which his health would never recover. Shortly after his return he published Yabu no naka ("In a Grove", 1922). During the trip, Akutagawa visited numerous cities of southeastern China including Nanjing, Shanghai, Hangzhou and Suzhou. Before his travel, he wrote a short story ""; concerning the Chinese Christian community; according to his own imagination of Nanjing influenced by Classical Chinese literature.

Influences

Akutagawa's stories were influenced by his belief that the practice of literature should be universal and can bring together Western and Japanese cultures. This can be seen in the way that Akutagawa uses existing works from a variety of cultures and time periods and either rewrites the story with modern sensibilities or creates new stories using ideas from multiple sources. Culture and the formation of a cultural identity is also a major theme in several of Akutagawa's works. In these stories, he explores the formation of cultural identity during periods in history where Japan was most open to outside influences. An example of this is his story Hōkyōnin no Shi ("The Martyr", 1918) which is set in the early missionary period.

The portrayal of women in Akutagawa's stories was primarily shaped by the influence of three women who acted as his mother figures; most significant was his biological mother Fuku, from whom he worried about inheriting her mental illness. Although Akutagawa was removed from Fuku eight months after his birth, he identified strongly with her and believed that, if at any moment he might go mad, life was meaningless. His aunt Fuki played the most prominent role in his upbringing, controlling much of Akutagawa's life as well as demanding much of his attention, especially as she grew older. Women that appear in Akutagawa's stories, much like the women he identified as mothers, were mostly written as dominating, aggressive, deceitful, and selfish. Conversely, men were often represented as the victims of such women.

Later life 

The final phase of Akutagawa's literary career was marked by his deteriorating physical and mental health. Much of his work during this period is distinctly autobiographical, some even taken directly from his diaries. His works during this period include Daidōji Shinsuke no hansei ("The Early Life of Daidōji Shinsuke", 1925) and Tenkibo ("Death Register", 1926).

Akutagawa had a highly publicized dispute with Jun'ichirō Tanizaki over the importance of structure versus lyricism in story. Akutagawa argued that structure, how the story was told, was more important than the content or plot of the story, whereas Tanizaki argued the opposite.

Akutagawa's final works include Kappa (1927), a satire based on a creature from Japanese folklore, Haguruma ("Spinning Gears", 1927), Aru ahō no isshō ("A Fool's Life"), and Bungeiteki na, amari ni bungeiteki na ("Literary, All Too Literary", 1927).

Towards the end of his life, Akutagawa began suffering from visual hallucinations and anxiety over the fear that he had inherited his mother's mental disorder. In 1927 he survived a suicide attempt, together with a friend of his wife. He later died of suicide after taking an overdose of Veronal, which had been given to him by Mokichi Saitō on 24 July of the same year. In his will he wrote that he felt a  about the future. He was 35 years old.

Legacy 
Akutagawa wrote over 150 short stories during his brief life, a number of which were adapted into other art forms: Akira Kurosawa's classic 1950 film Rashōmon retells Akutagawa's In a Grove, with the title and the frame scenes set in the Rashomon Gate taken from Akutagawa's Rashōmon. Ukrainian composer Victoria Poleva wrote the ballet Gagaku (1994), based on Akutagawa's Hell Screen. Japanese composer Mayako Kubo wrote an opera named Rashomon, based on Akutagawa's story. The German version premiered in Graz, Austria in 1996, and the Japanese version in Tokyo in 2002.

In 1930, writer Tatsuo Hori, who saw himself as a disciple of Akutagawa, published his short story Sei kazoku (lit. "The Holy Family"), which was written under the impression of Akutagawa's death and even paid reference to the dead mentor in the shape of the deceased character Kuki. In 1935, Akutagawa's lifelong friend Kan Kikuchi established the literary award for promising new writers, the Akutagawa Prize, in his honor.

In 2020 NHK produced and aired the film A Stranger in Shanghai. It depicts Akutagawa's time in as a reporter in the city and stars Ryuhei Matsuda.

Selected works

Works in English translation 
Eminent Authors of Contemporary Japan, Vol. 2. Trans. Eric S. Bell & Eiji Ukai. Tokyo: Kaitakusha, 1930(?).
The Spider's Web.--The Autumn.--The Nose.
Tales Grotesque and Curious. Trans. Glenn W. Shaw. Tokyo: The Hokuseido Press, 1930.
Tobacco and the devil.--The nose.--The handkerchief.--Rashōmon.--Lice.--The spider's thread.--The wine worm.--The badger.--The ball.--The pipe.--Mōri Sensei.
Hell Screen and Other Stories. Trans. W.H.H. Norman. Tokyo: The Hokuseido Press, 1948.
Jigokuhen.--Jashūmon.--The General.--Mensura Zoilii.
Kappa. Trans. Seiichi Shiojiri. Tokyo: The Hokuseido Press, 1951.
The Three Treasures. Trans. Sasaki Takamasa. Tokyo: The Hokuseido Press, 1951.
The Real Tripitaka and Other Pieces. George Allen & Unwin Ltd., 1952.
"San Sebastian" translated by Arthur Waley.
Rashomon and Other Stories. Trans. Takashi Kojima. Charles E. Tuttle Co., 1952.
In a Grove.--Rashomon.--Yam Gruel.--The Martyr.--Kesa and Morito.--The Dragon.
Not to be confused with a book of the same title that contains translations by Shaw, published by Hara Shobo in 1964 and reprinted in 1976.
Modern Japanese Literature. Grove/Atlantic, 1956. 
"Kesa and Morito" translated by Howard Hibbett.
Modern Japanese Stories: An Anthology. UNESCO, 1961.
"Autumn Mountain" translated by Ivan Morris.
Posthumous Works of Ryunosuke Akutagawa: His Life, Suicide, & Christ. Trans. Akio Inoue. 1961.
A Note Forwarded to a Certain Old Friend.--Life of a Certain Fool.--Western Man.--Western Man Continued.
Japanese Short Stories. Trans. Takashi Kojima. New York: Liveright Pub. Corp., 1961.
The Hell Screen.--A Clod of Soil.--Nezumi-Kozo.--Heichu, the Amorous Genius.--Genkaku-Sanbo.--Otomi's Virginity.--The Spider's Thread.--The Nose.--The Tangerines.--The Story of Yonosuke.
Exotic Japanese stories: The Beautiful and the Grotesque. Trans. Takashi Kojima & John McVittie. New York: Liveright Pub. Corp., 1964.
The Robbers.--The Dog, Shiro.--The Handkerchief.--The Dolls.--Gratitude.--The Faith of Wei Shêng.--The Lady, Roku-no-miya.--The Kappa.--Saigô Takamori.--The Greeting.--Withered Fields.--Absorbed in letters.--The Garden.--The Badger.--Heresy (Jashumon).--A Woman's Body.
Reissued by Liveright in 2010 as The Beautiful and the Grotesque.
Tu Tze-Chun. Trans. Dorothy Britton. Tokyo: Kodansha International, 1965.
Kappa. Trans. Geoffrey Bownas. London: Peter Owen Publishers, 1970. 
A Fool's Life. Trans. Will Petersen. New York: Grossman Publishers, 1970. 
La fille au chapeau rouge. Trans. Lalloz ed.
Cogwheels and Other Stories. Trans. Howard Norman. Oakville, Ontario: Mosaic Press, 1982. 
Cogwheels.--Hell Screen.--The Spider's Thread.
The Spider's Thread and Other Stories. Trans. Dorothy Britton. Tokyo: Kodansha International, 1987. 
The Spider's Thread.--The Art of the Occult.--Tu Tze-chun.--The Wagon.--The Tangerines.-- The Nose.-- The Dolls.-- Whitie. 
Hell screen. Cogwheels. A Fool's Life. Eridanos Press, 1987. 
Reprints Kojima and Petersen translations; "Cogwheels" translated by Cid Corman and Susumu Kamaike.
Akutagawa & Dazai: Instances of Literary Adaptation. Trans. James O'Brien. Tempe, Arizona: Arizona State University Press, 1988. 
The Clown's Mask.--The Immortal.--Rashō Gate.--Hell Screen.--Within a Grove.--The Shadow.
The Kyoto Collection: Stories from the Japanese. 1989
"The Faint Smiles of the Gods" translated by Tomoyoshi Genkawa & Bernard Susser.
Travels in China (Shina yuki). Trans. Joshua Fogel. Chinese Studies in History 30, no. 4 (1997).
Essential Akutagawa. New York: Marsilio Publishers, 1999. 
Rashomon.--The Nose.--Kesa and Morito.--The Spider's Thread.--Hell Screen.--The Ball.--Tu Tze-chun.--Autumn Mountain.--In a Grove.--The Faint Smiles of the Gods.--San Sebastian.--Cogwheels.--A Fool's Life.--A Note to a Certain Old Friend.
"Rashomon," "The Nose," "The Spider's Thread," "The Ball," & "In a Grove" translated by Seiji M. Lippit; "A Note to a Certain Old Friend" translated by Beongcheon Yu. Reprints translations by Britton, Corman & Kamaike, Genkawa & Susser, Hibbett, Kojima, Morris, Petersen, & Waley.
Rashomon and Seventeen Other Stories. Trans. Jay Rubin. Penguin Classics, 2006. 
Rashomon.--In a Bamboo Grove.--The Nose.--Dragon: The Old Potter's Tale.--The Spider Thread.--Hell Screen.--Dr. Ogata Ryosai: Memorandum.--O-Gin.--Loyalty.--The Story of a Head That Fell Off.--Green Onions.--Horse Legs.--Daidoji Shinsuke: The Early Years.--The Writer's Craft.--The Baby's Sickness.--Death Register.--The Life of a Stupid Man.--Spinning Gears.
The Columbia Anthology of Modern Japanese Literature, Vol. 1: From Restoration to Occupation, 1868-1945. New York: Columbia University Press, 2005. 
"The Nose" translated by Ivan Morris and "Christ of Nanking" translated by Van C. Gessel; also has three of Akutagawas haikus translated by Makoto Ueda.
A Fool's Life. Trans. Anthony Barnett & Toraiwa Naoko. Lewes, England: Allardyce Books, 2007. 
Mandarins. Trans. Charles De Wolf. Archipelago Books, 2007. 
Mandarins.--At the Seashore.--An Evening Conversation.--The Handkerchief.--An Enlightened Husband.--Autumn.--Winter.--Fortune.--Kesa and Morito.--The Death of a Disciple.--O’er a Withered Moor.--The Garden.--The Life of a Fool.--The Villa of the Black Crane.--Cogwheels.
3 Strange Tales. Trans. Glen Anderson. New York: One Peace Books, 2012. 
Rashomon.--A Christian Death.--Agni.--In a Grove. [sic]
Murder in the Age of Enlightenment: Essential Stories. Trans. Bryan Karetnyk. London: Pushkin Press, 2020. 
The Spider's Thread.--In a Grove.--Hell Screen.--Murder in the Age of Enlightenment.--The General.--Madonna in Black.--Cogwheels.

References

English 
 Keene, Donald. Dawn to the West. Columbia University Press; (1998). 
 Ueda, Makoto. Modern Japanese Writers and the Nature of Literature. Stanford University Press (1971). 
 Rashomon and Seventeen Other Stories - the Chronology Chapter, Trans. Jay Rubin. Penguin Classics (2007).

Japanese 
 Nakada, Masatoshi. Akutagawa Ryunosuke: Shosetsuka to haijin. Kanae Shobo (2000). 
 Shibata, Takaji. Akutagawa Ryunosuke to Eibungaku. Yashio Shuppansha (1993). 
 Takeuchi, Hiroshi. Akutagawa Ryunosuke no keiei goroku. PHP Kenkyujo (1983). 
 Tomoda, Etsuo. Shoki Akutagawa Ryunosuke ron. Kanrin Shobo (1984).

External links 

 
 
 
 
 Short works in English translation (from Asymptote (journal)).
 Short stories in English translation (from The Yale Review).
 Akutagawa Ryunosuke on aozora.gr.jp (complete texts with furigana)
 Akutagawa Ryunosuke on Amazon Kindle Store (Japanese texts with furigana)
 Literary Figures from Kamakura
 Ryunosuke Akutagawa's grave
 
 Rashomon and Seventeen Other Stories
 J'Lit | Authors : Ryunosuke Akutagawa | Books from Japan 

 
1892 births
1927 suicides
Drug-related suicides in Japan
Barbiturates-related deaths
University of Tokyo alumni
Writers from Tokyo
Japanese male short story writers
Japanese haiku poets
1927 deaths
Weird fiction writers